The 1972–73 Libyan Premier League was the 9th edition of the competition since its inception in 1963.

Overview
It was contested by 11 teams, and Al-Ahly (Tripoli) won the championship.

League standings

Final
Al-Ahly (Tripoli) 1-0 Al-Ahly (Benghazi)

References
Libya - List of final tables (RSSSF)

Libyan Premier League seasons
Libya
Premier League